J27 may refer to:
 J/27, a keelboat
 County Route J27 (California)
 , a Bangor-class minesweeper of the Royal Navy
 January 27, 2007 anti-war protest, in Washington, D.C.
 LNER Class J27, a British steam locomotive class
 Triangular orthobicupola, a Johnson solid (J27)